Lumber City can refer to:
Lumber City, Georgia
Lumber City, Pennsylvania